Doliotettix is a genus of true bugs belonging to the family Cicadellidae.

The species of this genus are found in Northern Europe.

Species:
 Doliotettix lunulata Zetterstedt, 1840

References

Cicadellidae
Hemiptera genera